The Medical Scientists Association of Victoria (MSAV) is a specialist union that represents the interests of scientists including dietitians, audiologists, perfusionists, medical physicists, research scientists and genetic counsellors employed in both the public and private sectors in Victoria, Australia. The MSAV negotiates terms and conditions of employment with employers on behalf of its members. The MSAV is a component Association of the Health Services Union of Australia (HSU) Victoria No.4 Branch.

References

External links 
 

Healthcare trade unions in Australia